Ourasi (7 April 1980 – 12 January 2013) was a chestnut French Trotter. He earned $2,913,314 during his career. His harness racing victories included three consecutive Prix d'Amérique at Vincennes, the second by approximately 18 lengths. Ourasi is considered by many to be the horse of the century. He won more than 50 consecutive races. Jean-René Gougeon (who died in July 2008), his trainer and driver, won the "Prix d'Amérique" with Ourasi 3 times. Ourasi won the "Prix d'Amérique" a fourth time with Minou Gougeon, the brother of Jean René Gougeon, who had had a stroke.

Background
Ourasi was born in Normandy in a small stud belonging to Raoul Ostheimer and Rachel Tessier. He was sired by Greyhound F out of Fleurasie by Remember F (his sire was not the illustrious American trotter of the same name).

Racing record
When Ourasi was 2 years old, he made his racing debut. He was trained by Rachel Ostheimer and driven by Raoul Ostheimer, who was deaf.

At the beginning of 1989, when Ourasi was 9 years old and trying to win his fourth Prix d'Amérique. The French president, François Mitterrand, came to see the race. Few expected Ourasi to lose. However, he finished third behind "Queila Gédé" and "Potin d'Amour".
 
On 28 January 1990, Ourasi broke the Prix d'Amérique's record.

Retirement

After mating with 130 mares from France, Scandinavia, and the United States, Ourasi produced only 8 foals from his first year at stud. Specialists were called from the around the world, but nothing could be done, and within 10 years, Ourasi produced just 38 foals. None of these foals became a champion.

Death

Ourasi was put down on 12 January 2013, after a brief spell of sickness, which had prevented him from eating for several days.

Major wins

Elite-Rennen: 1986

Prix d'Amérique: 1986, 1987, 1988, 1990
Prix de France: 1986, 1987, 1988
Grand Critérium de Vitesse de la Côte d'Azur: 1986, 1987, 1988, 1989
Prix de Paris: 1989
Prix de l'Étoile: 1985
Prix René Ballière: 1986, 1988
Critérium des 5 ans: 1985
Critérium des Jeunes: 1983
Prix de Bretagne: 1986
Prix du Bourbonnais: 1985, 1986, 1988
Prix de Bourgogne: 1987, 1988, 1989
Prix de Belgique: 1986, 1987, 1988, 1989
Prix de Washington: 1988
Prix de Croix: 1985
Prix d'Europe: 1985, 1986, 1988
Prix Roederer: 1985
Prix Kalmia: 1983
Prix Robert Auvray: 1985
Grand Prix du Sud-Ouest: 1987

Oslo Grand Prix: 1989

Main honourable mentions

March of Dimes Trot at Garden State Park : 2nd in 1988

Prix d'Amérique: 3rd in 1989
Prix de Bretagne: 2nd in 1985

Pedigree

External links
Ourasi Legend Horse

French Standardbred racehorses
1980 racehorse births
2013 racehorse deaths
Racehorses bred in France
Racehorses trained in France
Harness racing in France